Ramat Sharett (lit. "Sharett Heights") is a neighbourhood in southwest Jerusalem,  located between Ramat Denya and Beit VeGan. The neighborhood was established in 1974 and named for Moshe Sharett, Prime Minister of Israel in 1953-1955.

Ramat Sharett sits 860 meters above sea level.

Notable residents
Dalia Itzik
Yigal Yasinov
Ofer Berkovitch

References

Neighbourhoods of Jerusalem